Masaka Hospital, Rwanda, commonly known as Masaka Hospital, is a hospital in Rwanda. It is an urban, general hospital built between 2008 and 2011, with funding from the Government of China, as a gift to the Government of Rwanda.

Location
The hospital is located in the Masaka neighborhood, in the capital city of Kigali, the capital of Rwanda and the largest city in that country. The geographical coordinates of Masaka Hospital are 01°59'30.0"S, 30°12'43.0"E (Latitude:-1.991667; Longitude:30.211944).

Overview
The Chinese government, designed and built the hospital as a gift to the people of Rwanda. The institution which was completed in 2011, offers services in general medicine, emergency medicine, traditional Chinese medicine, dentistry, orthopedic surgery, and psychiatry. As of July 2018, the hospital is operated by a team of six Chinese doctors assisted by a smaller number of Rwandan medical doctors and dentists. At that time, three medical doctors were in China, pursuing master's degrees and one dentist had graduated with a Master of Dental Surgery and had returned to the hospital "to serve the community".

Other disciplines offered at this hospital include maternity services, internal medicine, pediatrics, imaging services, general surgery, tuberculosis treatment, nutrition services, general anesthesia, HIV/AIDS treatment, and outpatient services.

Target population
The hospital is intended to serve, primarily the residents of (a) Kicukiro District (b) Gasabo District and (c) Rwamagana District. The target population numbers between 380,000 and 400,000 people. The hospital is administered directly by the Rwanda Ministry of Health.

See also
List of hospitals in Rwanda

References

External links
 Masaka scandal: Doctor seeks clearance As of 22 October 2018.

Hospital buildings completed in 2011
Hospitals in Rwanda
Buildings and structures in Kigali
2011 establishments in Rwanda
Hospitals established in 2011
China–Rwanda relations